Jacques Mézard (born 3 December 1947) is a French lawyer and politician of the Radical Party of the Left who has been serving as a member of the Constitutional Council since 2019. He previously served as Minister of Agriculture and Food in 2017 and Minister of Territorial Cohesion from 2017 to 2018. A member of the Radical Party of the Left (PRG), he was a Senator representing the Cantal department from 2008 to 2017 and again from 2018 until 2019.

Early life
Jacques Mézard was born in Aurillac. He graduated from Panthéon-Assas University in Paris, where he received a law degree.

Career
From 1971 to 1976, he worked as a lawyer in Paris and taught law at the Pantheon-Sorbonne University. Additionally, he served as Vice President of Pantheon-Sorbonne University from 1970 to 1975. From 1977 to 2009, he worked as a lawyer in Aurillac.

He served as Deputy Mayor of Aurillac from 1982 to 1993. He also served as a member of the General Council of Cantal from 1994 to 2008. After the 2008 Senate election, he was installed as a Senator for Cantal. He was reelected in 2014. In 2011, he was chosen as President of the European Democratic and Social Rally group.

On 17 May 2017, Mézard was appointed Minister of Agriculture and Food in the First Philippe government. On 21 June 2017, he was appointed Minister of Territorial Cohesion in the Second Philippe Government, replacing Richard Ferrand. He left his position on 16 October 2018 to return to the Senate. On 11 March 2019, he was sworn in as a member of the Constitutional Council, following his appointment by President Emmanuel Macron.

References

|-

1947 births
Living people
People from Aurillac
Politicians from Auvergne-Rhône-Alpes
Radical Party of the Left politicians
Radical Movement politicians
French Ministers of Agriculture
French Senators of the Fifth Republic
Senators of Cantal
20th-century French lawyers
Paris 2 Panthéon-Assas University alumni
Academic staff of the University of Paris
Knights of the Ordre national du Mérite